Tough Assignment is a 1949 American crime film directed by William Beaudine and starring Don Barry, Marjorie Steele and Steve Brodie. It is regarded as a film noir.

Plot
A Los Angeles reporter and his photographer wife investigate a criminal gang trying to establish a cartel over beef supplies to the city's butcher shops.

Cast
 Don Barry as Dan Reilly
 Marjorie Steele as Margie Reilly 
 Steve Brodie as Boss Morgan 
 Marc Lawrence as Vince 
 Ben Welden as Sniffy 
 Sid Melton as Herman 
 John L. Cason as Joe
 Frank Richards as Steve
 Fred Kohler Jr. as Grant, Head Rancher 
 Michael Whalen as Hutchison 
 Edit Angold as Mrs. Schultz 
 Leander De Cordova as Mr. Schultz 
 Stanley Andrews as Chief Investigator Patterson 
 Stanley Price as Al Foster 
 Iris Adrian as Gloria
 Hugh Simpson as Ted 
 Gayle Kellogg as Jack Lowery

References

Bibliography
 Spicer, Andrew. Historical Dictionary of Film Noir. Scarecrow Press, 2010.
 Marshall, Wendy L. William Beaudine: From Silents to Television. Scarecrow Press, 2005.

External links

1949 films
American crime films
American black-and-white films
1949 crime films
Films directed by William Beaudine
Films scored by Albert Glasser
Lippert Pictures films
Films set in Los Angeles
1940s English-language films
1940s American films